Decade of Aggression is a double live album by Slayer, released on October 22, 1991, through Def American Records (later renamed to American Recordings) and produced by Rick Rubin. The album was recorded in three separate places on three separate dates. Its working title was Decade of Decadence until Mötley Crüe registered the name. Three of the album's tracks were included in the box set Soundtrack to the Apocalypse. The album's reception was generally positive, with Entertainment Weekly and Robert Christgau both giving the album a positive rating. The album reached number 55 in the Billboard 200 and also charted on two other charts.

Conception
While touring on the Clash of the Titans tour to promote the 1990 studio album Seasons in the Abyss, separate sections of the Decade of Aggression album were recorded on October 14, 1990, March 8, 1991, and July 13, 1991, however, AllMusic said that Rick Rubin's production "seems to be in terms of shaping the live sound to make it sound like this is all one gig." Although it had a working title of Decade of Decadence, it would be released as Decade of Aggression after Mötley Crüe copyrighted the name on their 1991 greatest hits album. It was released through Def American Recordings on October 22, 1991.

The release was intended to give them time to decide what their next album's style would be. Text in the book The Great Rock Discography said that it was released after the band had gained popularity, saying "Slayer had finally made it into the metal big league and summing up the first blood-soaked chapter of their career, the group duly released the live double set." It was also released to commemorate their 10th anniversary.

The album does not feature an overdub of guitars. In The Rough Guide To Rock, it was said to be "intense" and "put studio favorites through the live shredder in a brutal and definitive manner." Most of the tracks were a selection from South of Heaven, Reign in Blood, and Seasons in the Abyss. The album's total duration is one hour, twenty-five minutes, and twenty-eight seconds (85:28). Three of the album's tracks were included in the box set Soundtrack to the Apocalypse.

The album booklet includes a photo gallery with pictures dating back to 1982. The majority of the photos come from Kevin Estrada, who has said:

Reception

Thom Jurek, a staff writer for AllMusic, gave the album a rating of three out of five stars. Jurek gave notice to the album's sound quality, telling readers that it does not "capture the sheer overblown intensity of the unit in a concert setting," but that it comes closer than one may imagine. Jurek also gave note to how Rick Rubin made the two-discs sound like it were recorded at one gig, writing "Producer Rick Rubin stays out of the way; his production seems to be in terms of shaping the live sound to make it sound like this is all one gig." Entertainment Weeklys David Browne said that it was an "accurate aural snapshots of what it's like to be part of a crowd craning to see the action on a stage that seems two miles away." Browne also said that "they're perfect examples of the sad current state of the once-proud live rock album." Robert Christgau gave the album a star ("Honorable Mention is a worthy effort consumers attuned to its overriding aesthetic or individual vision may well like."), saying, "praise the Lord—I can hardly understand a word they're singing (Hell Awaits)." Joel McIver, author of The Bloody Reign of Slayer said that it was regarded as one of the best live albums released by a heavy metal band.

The album charted on three different charts. On November 9, 1991, it peaked at number 55 on the Billboard 200. On January 13, 1992, the album entered the Media Control Charts. It peaked at number 35. It maintained a number on the chart until February 2, 1992, giving it a total of three weeks on the chart.
On December 2, 1991 it entered the UK Album Charts, peaking at number 29. It stayed on the chart for two weeks.

Track listing

Standard edition

Disc one
All songs recorded at the Lakeland Civic Center in Lakeland, Florida on July 13, 1991.

Disc two
Tracks 3–6 and 8–10 recorded at the Orange Pavilion, San Bernardino, California, March 8, 1991.
Tracks 1, 2 and 7 recorded at the Wembley Arena, London, England, October 14, 1990.

Japanese edition and 1992 reissue limited edition
Disc one track listing remains the same.
Disc two track listing 1–6 remains the same.
Track 7 recorded at the Orange Pavilion, San Bernardino, California, March 8, 1991.
Track 8 recorded at the Wembley Arena, London, England, October 14, 1990.

Credits
The album's credits and personnel can be obtained from AllMusic.

Slayer
Tom Araya – bass, vocals
Kerry King – guitars
Jeff Hanneman – guitars
Dave Lombardo – drums

Production
Rick Rubin – producer
Greg Bess – engineer
Mike Carver – engineer
Jim Champagne – assistant engineer, mixing assistant
Patricia Chavarria – production coordination
Bill Dawes – remixing
Kevin Estrada – photography
Doug Field – engineer
Richard Kimball – executive producer
Phil Kneebone – engineer
Michael Lavine – photography
Mark Leialoha – photography
Brendan O'Brien – mixing, mixing engineer
Rick Sales – design
Chuck Smith – guitar technician
Alex Solca – photography
Tim Summerhayes – engineer
Howie Weinberg – mastering
Peter Yianilos – engineer
Roland Young – assistant engineer

Charts

Notes

References

1991 live albums
Slayer live albums
Albums produced by Rick Rubin
American Recordings (record label) albums